Rakiya Maraoui Quétier (born 12 September 1967) is a Moroccan-born French former long-distance runner who competed mainly in the marathon and cross country running. She competed in the marathon at the World Athletics Championships in 1993 and 2003, and represented France at the 2004 Summer Olympics. She was a three-time participant at the IAAF World Cross Country Championships (1986, 2000, 2001) and ran at the 1998 IAAF World Half Marathon Championships. She was the marathon gold medallist at the 1989 Jeux de la Francophonie. On the road running circuit, she was the winner of the 1990 Roma-Ostia Half Marathon and 2001 Corrida de Houilles

Born in Bni Bataou near the city of Beni Mellal, she is the sister of Fatna Maraoui, who later competed for the Italy national athletics team.

Rakiya distinguished herself at the 1999 European Cross Country Championships winning, under the team classification, the European title  at Velenje Slovenia, alongside  Fatima Yvelain and Fatima Hajjami.

In 2001, she won  the team bronze medal  at the 2000 IAAF World Cross Country Championships at Vilamoura Portugal, alongside Light-Fatima Yvelain,  Yamna Oubouhou-Belkacem and Blandine Bitzner-Ducret.  The following year, at the World Cross Country Championships at Ostend, she won another team bronze medal, alongside Oubouhou Yamna-Belkacem, Rodica Nagel and Zahia Dahmani.

In 2003, she finished third at the Paris Half Marathon, and fifth in the Paris Marathon and placed 21st at the marathon of the World Championships in Paris / Saint-Denis. In the marathon of the Olympic Games in Athens in 2004, she did not finish.

Nationally, she won the title of champion of France in the 10 000 m in 2000, in Cross-country in 2000 and 2001 (long race) and in the marathon in 1999.

National titles
French Athletics Championships
10,000 m: 2000
French Cross Country Championships
Long course: 2000, 2001
French Marathon Championships: 1999

Personal bests 
 5000 metres: 15:46.30 min, 5 June 1999, Marseille
 10,000 metres: 31:56.1 min, 27 June 2000, Strasbourg
 10K run: 32:52 min, 23 March 2003, La Courneuve
 Half marathon: 1:09:29 h, 10 March 1996, Lisbon
 Marathon: 2:28:17 h, 24 September 1995, Berlin

See also
List of eligibility transfers in athletics
List of sportspeople who competed for more than one nation

References

External links 
 
 Athletenporträt at Marathoninfo.free.fr

1967 births
Living people
People from Béni Mellal-Khénifra
French female long-distance runners
Moroccan female long-distance runners
French female cross country runners
Moroccan female cross country runners
Olympic athletes of France
Athletes (track and field) at the 2004 Summer Olympics
World Athletics Championships athletes for Morocco
World Athletics Championships athletes for France